Guy Mowbray Sayer, CBE, JP (18 June 1924 – 14 April 2009) was the chief manager of the Hongkong and Shanghai Banking Corporation from 1972 to 1977, and an unofficial member of the Legislative and Executive Councils of Hong Kong.

References

}

1924 births
2009 deaths
HSBC people
Members of the Executive Council of Hong Kong
Members of the Legislative Council of Hong Kong
Bankers from London
20th-century English businesspeople